Gábor Vén (born 31 July 1977) is a retired Hungarian football midfielder.

References

1977 births
Living people
People from Kalocsa
Hungarian footballers
Vác FC players
Kecskeméti TE players
Ferencvárosi TC footballers
Diósgyőri VTK players
Nyíregyháza Spartacus FC players
Budapest Honvéd FC players
FC Sopron players
Mosonmagyaróvári TE 1904 footballers
Egri FC players
Jászapáti VSE footballers
Nemzeti Bajnokság I players
Association football midfielders
Sportspeople from Bács-Kiskun County